The Dewatto  River is a stream in the U.S. state of Washington. It originates in western Kitsap Peninsula and flows south, emptying into Hood Canal.  The name "Dewatto" comes from the Twana placename [duʔwátaxʷ], which implies the presence of spirits causing mental derangement near the stream's mouth.

Course

The Dewatto River originates in western Kitsap Peninsula near the town of Holly. It flows south and slightly west, approximately parallel to Hood Canal, then turns west to enter Hood Canal at Dewatto Bay.

See also
 List of rivers of Washington

References

External links
Port of Dewatto

Rivers of Washington (state)
Rivers of Kitsap County, Washington
Rivers of Mason County, Washington